Tarek Mostafa (born 1 April 1971) is an Egyptian football manager and a retired footballer.

Career
Mostafa started his career in Division II club Eastern Tobacco, notably played for Zamalek SC for a period of four successful years. He also had a spell with Ankaragücü in the Turkish Super Lig. He played for El Gouna FC in Egypt from 2007 to 2009, then he retired.

Mostafa has played for the senior Egypt national football team, participating in the 1998 African Cup of Nations and scoring one of the two winning goals in the final.

Honours

Club
Zamalek
 Caf Champions League: 1996
 Caf Super Cup: 1997
 Afro-Asian Club Championship: 1997
 Egypt Cup: 1999

International
Egypt
 Africa Cup of Nations: 1998

References

External links 

Tarek Mostafa at Footballdatabase

1971 births
Living people
Egyptian footballers
Egypt international footballers
1998 African Cup of Nations players
Eastern Company SC players
Zamalek SC players
Neuchâtel Xamax FCS players
MKE Ankaragücü footballers
Egyptian expatriate footballers
Egyptian expatriate sportspeople in Switzerland
Petrojet SC players
Egyptian Premier League players
Association football midfielders
Fujairah FC managers